The 2002–03 National Division Three South was the third season (sixteenth overall) of the fourth division (south) of the English domestic rugby union competition using the name National Division Three South.  New teams to the division included Rosslyn Park who were relegated from the 2001–02 National Division Two while Havant (champions) and Basingstoke (playoffs) were promoted from London Division 1 along with champions of South West Division 1 – Weston-super-Mare.  The league system was 2 points for a win and 1 point for a draw.  The league system was 2 points for a win and 1 point for a draw with the league champions going straight up into National Division Two and the runners up playing a playoff against the runners up from National Division Three North for the final promotion place.

By the end of the season, Rosslyn Park made an instant return to National Division Two by winning the league championship, beating runners up Lydney to the title by virtue of just two points.  Lydney would join Rosslyn Park in the 2003–04 National Division Two by winning their playoff game against the 2002–03 National Division Three North runners up New Brighton.  At the other end of the table, Camberley were comfortable the worst team in the division with 26 defeats out of the 26 games played and over 1,000 points conceded.  Newly promoted Havant made a much better fight out of it in what was a very close relegation scrap, winning their last 3 games but eventually going down with only 2 points separating them from 9th placed Tabard.  Camberley would drop down to London Division 1 while Havant went back into South West Division 1.

Participating teams and locations

Final league table

Results

Round 1

Round 2

Round 3

Round 4

Round 5

Round 6 

Postponed.  Game rescheduled to 28 December 2002.

Postponed.  Game rescheduled to 28 December 2002.

Postponed.  Game rescheduled to 28 December 2002.

Postponed.  Game rescheduled to 28 December 2002.

Round 7

Round 8

Round 9 

Postponed.  Game rescheduled to 15 February 2003.

Postponed.  Game rescheduled to 15 February 2003.

Round 10 

Postponed.  Game rescheduled to 22 March 2003.

Round 11 

Postponed.  Game rescheduled to 8 March 2003.

Round 12

Round 13

Round 14

Round 15

Round 6 (rescheduled games) 

Game rescheduled from 19 October 2002.

Game rescheduled from 19 October 2002.

Game rescheduled from 19 October 2002.

Game rescheduled from 19 October 2002.

Round 16 

Postponed.  Game rescheduled for 8 March 2003.

Round 17 

Postponed.  Game rescheduled to 15 February 2003.

Postponed.  Game rescheduled to 8 March 2003.

Postponed.  Game rescheduled to 22 March 2003.

Postponed.  Game rescheduled to 15 February 2003.

Postponed.  Game rescheduled to 22 March 2003.

Round 18

Round 19

Round 20 

Postponed.  Game rescheduled to 8 March 2003.

Postponed.  Game rescheduled to 5 April 2003.

Postponed.  Game rescheduled to 22 March 2003.

Round 21

Rounds 9 & 17 (rescheduled games) 

Game rescheduled from 11 January 2003.

Game rescheduled from 9 November 2002.

Game rescheduled from 9 November 2002.

Game rescheduled from 11 January 2003.

Round 22

Round 23

Rounds 11, 16, 17 & 20 (rescheduled games) 

Game rescheduled from 1 February 2003.

Game rescheduled from 11 January 2003.

Game rescheduled from 4 January 2003.

Game rescheduled from 23 November 2002.

Round 24

Rounds 10, 17 & 20 (rescheduled games) 

Game rescheduled from 16 November 2002.

Game rescheduled from 11 January 2003.

Game rescheduled from 1 February 2003.

Game rescheduled from 11 January 2003.

Round 25

Round 20 (rescheduled game) 

Game rescheduled from 1 February 2003.

Round 26

Promotion play-off
The league runners up of National Division Three South and North would meet in a playoff game for promotion to National Division Two.  Lydney were runners-up in the south and because they had a better league record than north runners-up, New Brighton, they hosted the play-off match.

Total season attendances

Individual statistics 

 Note that points scorers includes tries as well as conversions, penalties and drop goals.

Top points scorers

Top try scorers

Season records

Team
Largest home win — 72 pts 
77 - 5 Rosslyn Park at home to Basingstoke on 11 January 2003
Largest away win — 57 pts
67 - 10 Rosslyn Park away to Old Colfeians on 14 December 2002
Most points scored — 82 pts 
82 - 17 Rosslyn Park at home to Westcombe Park on 21 December 2002
Most tries in a match — 14
Rosslyn Park at home to Basingstoke on 11 January 2003
Most conversions in a match — 8 (x3)
Rosslyn Park away to Old Colfeians on 14 December 2002
Rosslyn Park at home to Westcombe Park on 21 December 2002
Havant v Weston-super-Mare on 5 April 2003
Most penalties in a match — 7 
Blackheath at home to Redruth on 14 December 2002
Most drop goals in a match — 2 
Lydney away to North Walsham on 28 December 2012

Player
Most points in a match — 32
 Sam Howard for Rosslyn Park away to Old Colfeians on 14 December 2002
Most tries in a match — 4 (x3)
 Scott Pollock for Old Patesians at home to Camberley on 1 February 2003
 Christopher for Basingstoke at home to North Walsham on 8 March 2003
 Nick Marval for Rosslyn Park at home to Tabard on 22 March 2003
Most conversions in a match — 8 (x3)
 Sam Howard for Rosslyn Park away to Old Colfeians on 14 December 2002
 Sam Howard for Rosslyn Park at home to Westcombe Park on 21 December 2002
 Owen Cobbe for Havant v Weston-super-Mare on 5 April 2003
Most penalties in a match — 7
 Jonathan Griffin for Blackheath at home to Redruth on 14 December 2002
Most drop goals in a match — 1
N/A - multiple players

Attendances
Highest — 650
Redruth at home to Rosslyn Park on 7 September 2002
Lowest — 180
Tabard at home to Blackheath on 9 November 2002
Highest Average Attendance — 570
Redruth
Lowest Average Attendance — 180
Tabard

Extremely poor attendance tracking meant it was impossible to get an accurate figure for attendances during this season.  The figures above are simply the ones documented and larger/smaller attendances than those mentioned are very likely.

See also
 English rugby union system
 Rugby union in England

References

External links
 NCA Rugby

2002–03
2002–03 in English rugby union leagues